Nomorhamphus is a southeast Asian genus of viviparous halfbeaks from streams, rivers and lakes in Sulawesi (Indonesia) and the Philippines. They are all viviparous, producing small clutches of around a dozen fry about 10 to 15 mm long at birth. Females are generally larger than the males. Males are also more brightly coloured than the females (often having red, black, or blue patches on their fins). Compared with many other halfbeaks, the lower mandible, or beak, is relatively short, on females in particular barely protruding beyond the length of the upper mandible. The males of some species (e.g., N. ebrardtii) have short, straight beaks, but those of others (e.g., N. liemi) have short beaks that curve downwards forming a shape often compared to a goatee beard by aquarists. N. aenigma is unique within Nomorhamphus because of its lack of lower jaw elongation.

Nomorhamphus feed extensively on small insects, either in the form of aquatic larvae or as flying insects that have fallen onto the surface of the water. They are important predators on insects such as mosquitoes, so play a role in controlling malaria. Nomorhamphus are too small to be of value as food, but they do have some value as aquarium fish.

Reproduction

Nomorhamphus species are livebearing fish that practise internal fertilisation. The male is equipped with a gonopodium-like anal fin known as a gonopodium that delivers sperm into the female. The gestation period is about six weeks. The exact mode of reproduction ranges from ovoviviparity through to viviparity, and in some species, oophagy is known, as well. Only around ten to twenty embryos are developed at a time, but at birth these are fairly large (around ) and well developed, able to take small prey, such as Daphnia, immediately after birth.

Species
There are currently 20 recognized species in this genus:
 Nomorhamphus aenigma Kobayashi,  Masengi & Yamahira, 2020
Nomorhamphus bakeri Fowler & B. A. Bean, 1922
 Nomorhamphus brembachi D. Vogt, 1978
 Nomorhamphus celebensis M. C. W. Weber & de Beaufort, 1922 (Poso halfbeak)
 Nomorhamphus ebrardtii Popta, 1912
 Nomorhamphus hageni Popta, 1912
 Nomorhamphus kolonodalensis A. D. Meisner & Louie, 2000
 Nomorhamphus lanceolatus Huylebrouck, Hadiaty & Herder, 2014 
 Nomorhamphus liemi D. Vogt, 1978
 Nomorhamphus manifesta A. D. Meisner, 2001
 Nomorhamphus megarrhamphus Brembach, 1982
 Nomorhamphus pectoralis Fowler, 1934
 Nomorhamphus philippina Ladiges, 1972
 Nomorhamphus pinnimaculata A. D. Meisner, 2001
 Nomorhamphus rex Huylebrouck, Hadiaty & Herder, 2012 
 Nomorhamphus rossi A. D. Meisner, 2001
 Nomorhamphus sagittarius Huylebrouck, Hadiaty & Herder, 2014 
 Nomorhamphus towoetii Ladiges, 1972
 Nomorhamphus vivipara W. K. H. Peters, 1865
 Nomorhamphus weberi Boulenger, 1897

References

Further reading
 Scott, Peter (1997): Livebearing Fishes, Tetra Press, 

 
Zenarchopteridae
Live-bearing fish
Viviparous fish
Fishkeeping
Ray-finned fish genera